Didsbury (Vertical Extreme Skydiving) Aerodrome  was located  south southeast of Didsbury, Alberta, Canada. This airport was in the 1990s used by the Canadian Skydiving Centre.

Vertical Extreme Skydiving has moved to Vulcan, Alberta.

Briefly, Vertical Extreme Skydiving had reopened the airport for use as "Didsbury (Vertical Extreme Skydiving) Aerodrome" prior to their move. Currently the airport is listed as abandoned.

References

External links
Place to Fly on COPA's Places to Fly airport directory

Defunct airports in Alberta
Mountain View County